Alex Woodburn is an English professional rugby union player who plays for USRC Tigers RFC. He is currently dual-registered with Hartpury College R.F.C.

References

1992 births
Living people
English rugby union players
Gloucester Rugby players
Rugby union players from Bristol
Rugby union flankers